This is a list of airports in Tunisia, sorted by location.



List 

ICAO location identifiers link to airport page at Office de l'Aviation Civile et des Aeroports (OACA), the Tunisian Civil Aviation & Airports Authority.

Airport names shown in bold indicate the airport has scheduled service on commercial airlines.

See also 
 Transport in Tunisia
 Tunisian Air Force
 List of airports by ICAO code: D#DT - Tunisia
 Wikipedia:WikiProject Aviation/Airline destination lists: Africa#Tunisia

References 
 Office de l'Aviation Civile et des Aeroports (OACA) at Tunisian Ministry of Transport
 
 

Tunisia
 
Airports
Airports
Tunisia